Bárbara  is a 1980 Argentine comedy film drama directed by Gino Landi. The film stars Raffaella Carrà as Bárbara, where she falls in love with an Argentine photographer (Jorge Martínez). Irma Córdoba also stars as The Dame. The film premiered on June 12, 1980 in Buenos Aires.

Cast
Raffaella Carrà	 ... 	Bárbara
Jorge Martínez (Argentine actors)	... 	Mauricio Karagorggevich (Mauro)
Charlie Díez Gómez
Jacques Arndt
Carlos Bustamante
Rubén Szuchmacher
Juan Manuel Tenuta
Cacho Bustamante
Irma Córdoba	... 	La Dama
Edda Díaz
Arturo Noal
Daniel Ripari
Nino Udine
Juan Carlos Villa
Miguel Logarzo

External links
 

1980 films
1980s Spanish-language films
1980 comedy-drama films
Films shot in Buenos Aires
Films set in Buenos Aires
1980 comedy films
1980 drama films
Argentine comedy-drama films
1980s Argentine films